Hooking Up is a collection of essays and a novella by American author Tom Wolfe, a number of which were earlier published in popular magazines.

The essays cover diverse topics dating from as early as 1965, including both non-fiction and fiction, along with snipes at his contemporaries John Updike, Norman Mailer and John Irving.

Contents

Hooking Up
Hooking Up: What Life was Like at the Turn of the Second Millennium: An American's World – contemporary teenage promiscuity.

The Human Beast
Two Young Men Who Went West – profiles of Robert Noyce and William Shockley; especially comparing Noyce, founder of Intel and a graduate of Grinnell College, with Josiah Grinnell, its founder.
Digibabble, Fairy Dust, and the Human Anthill
Sorry, But Your Soul Just Died - essay by Tom Wolfe (Forbes, 1996) contains profile of E. O. Wilson.

Vita Robusta, Ars Anorexica
In the Land of the Rococo Marxists
The Invisible Artist
The Great Relearning
My Three Stooges –Wolfe's castigation of Mailer, Updike, and Irving

Ambush at Fort Bragg: A Novella
Ambush at Fort Bragg – a fictional investigative television program delves into military harassment of gay people.

The New Yorker Affair
Foreword: Murderous Gutter Journalism
Tiny Mummies! The True Story of the Ruler of 43rd Street's Land of the Walking Dead! – 1965 profile of The New Yorker editor William Shawn
Lost in the Whichy Thickets
Afterword: High in the Saddle

Publication data
Tom Wolfe, Hooking Up (2000), Farrar, Straus and Giroux, hardcover: 
2001 Picador trade paperback: 
2001 Picador mass market paperback:

References

2000 non-fiction books
Essay collections
Essay collections by Tom Wolfe
Books by Tom Wolfe
Farrar, Straus and Giroux books